Don Amendolia (born February 1, 1945 in Glassboro, New Jersey) is an American actor.

Career 
He played Big Al Kennedy in NBC's soap opera Sunset Beach, had a recurring role on Twin Peaks, and appeared in one episode of Cheers.

Amendolia directed one episode of Growing Pains and two episodes of Harry and the Hendersons. He has appeared on Broadway in 33 Variations, Stepping Out, and My One and Only. He directed the rotating cast of the Off-Broadway show, Wicked. He also played the Wizard on the second national tour of the musical Wicked. He played his first performance on December 9, 2009, replacing Tom McGowan.

Amendolia gave acting lessons and assigned workouts to the cast of the film Purple Rain.

Filmography

Film

Television

References

External links
 

1945 births
Living people
American male television actors
American male soap opera actors
People from Woodbury, New Jersey